David Price (born 6 July 1983) is a British former professional boxer who competed from 2009 to 2019. At regional level, he held multiple heavyweight championships, including the British and Commonwealth titles from 2012 to 2013, and challenged once for the European title in 2015. As an amateur, he won a bronze medal at the 2008 Olympics, gold at the 2006 Commonwealth Games and 2008 EU Championships, and three ABA titles; all in the super-heavyweight division.

Amateur career
Early in his career, Price boxed for Long Lane ABC before leaving through lack of available funding, for Salisbury ABC and in 2003 became the youngest ever ABA champion in the super-heavyweight division, at 19 years and 272 days old. He competed for England at a number of international tournaments, he beat Travis Kauffman twice at the 2003 USA vs. England Tournament. In August 2003 he won the Commonwealth Confederations tournament in Kuala Lumpur, defeating Muzzafar Iqbal of Pakistan 21:9, and Justin Whitehead of Australia 22:6. He then defeated Gregory Corbin on points in the England–US duel in Liverpool.

Price lost to Roberto Cammarelle in the quarter-finals of the European Amateur Boxing Championships in Bulgaria in 2004, a defeat that prevented him from going to the Athens Olympics. Later that year Price made it to the finals of the Tammer Tournament in Finland, but he was stopped by Bermane Stiverne. He bounced back to win his second A.B.A Title in March 2005, defeating Damien Campbell of Repton ABC in the final. He also went on to win the 4 Nations Championships and two weeks later, a win which enabled him to compete in the inaugural 4 Nations vs Cuba match, in which he was his side's sole victor, defeating Lisovan Hernandez. He participated at the 2005 World Amateur Boxing Championships but lost on points to Robert Helenius 25–22.

At the Strandya Cup in Bulgaria, he was stopped by Ukrainian Vyacheslav Glazkov, though he ended the year on a high note defeating highly touted teenage compatriot and future unified world heavyweight champion Tyson Fury 22:8. Then going on to win his 3rd A.B.A title, defeating Tom Dallas 27:4. At the 2007 Commonwealth Championships he stopped Australian Daniel Beahan in the final.

2006 Commonwealth Games

Price captained the 2006 Commonwealth Games boxing team in Melbourne and achieved a gold medal there, beating Indian Varghese Johnson in the process, despite being knocked down three times.

2007 World Amateur Boxing Championships
At the 2007 World Amateur Boxing Championships in Chicago he defeated three opponents including Marko Tomasović of Croatia 23:11, Frenchman Mohamed Samoudi whom he stopped, Primislav Dimovski (Skopje) 20:4 but a hand injury kept him from showing for his fight against Roberto Cammarelle. GB head coach Terry Edwards said: "David has boxed particularly well in these World Championships and it is therefore a big disappointment that he was unable to box for automatic Olympic qualification here in Chicago, a right he had fought for."

2008 Olympic Games

Two years after his Commonwealth Games success, Price captained the GB team who went to Beijing for the 2008 Olympic Games, beating Romanian World Junior Champion Cristian Ciocanu to qualify. Price met European Champion Islam Timurziev in the first round of the Olympics, and stopped Timurziev in the second round after dropping him to the canvas on two occasions in the round, the scores were level at 2:2 at the time. The next round saw Price matched against Lithuanian Jaroslavas Jakšto but Price progressed into the next round after Jakšto retired with an injury at the end of the first round when the scorecards favored Price, 3:1. Guaranteed at least a bronze medal, David Price was to meet Italian world champion Roberto Cammarelle, a bout in which the referee stopped in the second round when the scores favored the eventual Olympic gold medalist, Cammarelle, 10:1. The Englishman ended an impressive run at the Olympics with a bronze medal in the 91+kg Super-Heavyweight division. After winning a bronze medal, and not achieving the gold he sorely wanted, he announced his intention to turn professional.

Professional career

Early career
Price made his debut at the age of 25 at the Echo Arena in Liverpool on 28 March 2009 defeating David Ingleby via 3rd-round TKO. He went on to win his next nine fights with seven coming inside the distance. Price stopped fellow British fighter Tom Dallas at the Liverpool Olympia, inflicting a second-round TKO propelling Price closer to a British title shot. He scheduled a bout with John McDermott, due to take place on 5 November 2011, but Price was forced to pull out of the British and Commonwealth title eliminator with a rib injury which he suffered in sparring with former England team-mate Danny Price. Price also sparred with fellow heavyweight David Haye before Haye's world title fight with Ukrainian Wladimir Klitschko in July 2011.

On 21 January 2012, Price was fighting for the English heavyweight title against an experienced fighter in John McDermott. The winner of the bout would be the mandatory challenger against the British and Commonwealth heavyweight champion, Tyson Fury; who many fans and pundits felt that McDermott won against in the first bout between the pair. It only took 73 seconds of the first round for Price to win against McDermott. Price knocked down McDermott 3 times before the referee, Howard John Foster, decided to end the bout; inflicting McDermott with a TKO defeat.

ESPN Prospect of the year
On 19 May 2012 at Aintree Racecourse in Liverpool, Price beat Sam Sexton in a fourth-round KO victory, and won the vacant British and Commonwealth heavyweight titles. The fight was ordered by the BBBof C on 9 February after Tyson Fury vacated in order to step up. Widely considered Price's best performance to date, he impressively controlled the bout with his jab and distance, hurting Sexton badly whenever he connected. In the fourth round Price knocked Sexton out cold. Price's promoter Frank Maloney likened the victory to Lennox Lewis' breakout performance against Donovan Ruddock and Price was universally considered at that time to be the most dangerous up and coming contender in the division.

On 13 October 2012 he made his first defence of his British and Commonwealth heavyweight titles against fellow Olympian Audley Harrison at Liverpool's Echo Arena on the 'Battle of the Olympians' bill, scoring the most brutal and vicious knockout of his career to date. Price landed a powerful right hand after 30 seconds sending Harrison retreating to the ropes, he then unloaded with a concussive combination; an uppercut followed by body blow and then a right hand that shattered Harrison's nose and sent him to the canvas unconscious. It had taken Price just 82 seconds to score the win and he showed genuine concern for his opponent after the fight. Maloney offered Fury £500,000 to fight Price. Immediately after the fight, it was confirmed that Price would box Matt Skelton on 30 November. He knocked out Skelton in the 2nd round of the fight.

As a result of his impressive performances and formidable punching power, Price was named Prospect of the Year by ESPN in 2012.

Consecutive defeats

Price vs. Thompson I, II
In December 2012, it was announced that Price would fight American former two-time world title challenger Tony Thompson (36-3, 24 KOs) at the Echo Arena in Liverpool on 23 February 2013. This was regarded as a big step up for Price and a win would see him likely earn a future world title fight. At the time, Thompson was ranked IBF #5. Promoter Frank Maloney said, "This is the right fight at the right time for David and one where a win will propel him even higher. Thompson still has ambition and I am certain that he will come to win and score a major upset." Price was a heavy betting favourite among bookmakers and many were intrigued to see how Price would fare against a common Wladimir Klitschko opponent. Price was looking to fight Tyson Fury for the Lonsdale belt after this fight. The bout was televised in the UK on Boxnation.

Price lost his first professional fight, as he was stopped in two rounds by Thompson in front of 6,000 fans in attendance. Price took his time but was seemingly in total control of the bout. In the second round Price caught Thompson with a right hand sending him hurt to the ropes, he then launched his first big attack of the bout. Thompson had been cautious and tentative throughout and it looked as though he was soon to be taken over and stopped, however to the crowd's shock Thompson threw a counter right hand that hit Price awkwardly behind the ear sending him to the canvas, Price beat the count but the location of the punch behind the ear and on the neck damaged his equilibrium and the bout was waved off. Thompson had scored the heavyweight upset of the year at that point.

After the post-fight press conference, Price's 60 year old promoter Frank Maloney collapsed. He was attended to by paramedics, given oxygen and then taken to hospital for further check-up. Maloney previously suffered a heart attack in 2009 after his fighter Darren Sutherland died.

Promoter Maloney claimed there was a rematch clause in place, but they wouldn't ask for it straight away and let Thompson enjoy his win. Upon hearing about the rematch clause, Thompson replied, "They can clause all the hell they want. I'm not coming back. They vastly underpaid me for this fight and I just took it for the opportunity. I've now created that opportunity and if they want to fight me again, then first of all they've got to come to my side of the Atlantic and then they've got to pay me what I'm worth." On 27 March, a rematch was confirmed to take place again at the Echo Arena, despite Thompson stating he would only fight in the United States, on 6 July. According to Maloney, although there was a rematch clause in place, the fight was still hard to make as rival promotions were also interested in Thompson. Price stated he also had other options. One option was to fight British rival Derek Chisora, but decided to take a small pay cut to avenge his only loss. Price revealed former world champion Lennox Lewis advised him to take the rematch. Thompson weighed 259 pounds, 3 pounds lighter than the first fight and Price came in at 250 pounds. The fight was aired live in the United States on Wealth TV.

Price put Thompson down heavily in round 2 with a powerful right hook, but Thompson beat the count. Both men traded shots, with Price absorbing a lot of shots to the body; the damage was visible by the fourth round. Price, who seemed exhausted after round 4, was ordered by Lennox Lewis from ringside to stand up in the corner between rounds to liven himself. Price seemed to collapse physically in the fifth round, at one point turning his back to Thompson and retreating to the corner where the referee started a count. Price motioned as though he had given up and the referee stopped the fight awarding Thompson a 5th-round TKO victory.

After this loss Price separated from trainers Franny Smith and Lennox Lewis and it was later announced that Thompson had failed a drugs test and was subsequently banned by the British Boxing Board of Control for 18 months. Thompson's team was furious over the failed drug test and in a statement they claimed Thompson was prescribed high blood pressure medication and it was disclosed prior to the fight with Price.

Rebuilding in Germany

Back to winning ways
In November 2013, it was announced that Price would be signing a promotional deal with German boxing promoter Team Sauerland and on 5 December 2013 it was announced that he would be vacating his British and Commonwealth titles.

In his first fight back following the back-to-back losses to Thompson, Price got back to winning ways with a first-round knockout victory over Istvan Ruzsinszky in Stuttgart, Germany on 25 January 2014. Price displayed his trademark power flooring Ruzsinszky, who was a late replacement for Konstantin Airich, with a big right hand.

Price recorded a second successive win on 12 April 2014 with the third-round knockout of Ondrej Pala in Esbjerg, Denmark. Price was forced to climb off the canvas after a flash knockdown in the opening round, but was able to regain his composure in the second round before flooring Pala twice in the third, forcing the referee to call a halt to the action.

In his next contest, Price comfortably outpointed Yaroslav Zavorotnyi on 7 June 2014 in Schwerin, Germany. After ten hard fought rounds, for the first time in four years, the former British and Commonwealth went the scheduled distance, leaving the decision in the hands of the judges.

On 21 February 2015, Price defeated Irineu Beato Costa Junior in Berlin, Germany. After a cautious start, Price began to boss his Brazilian opponent around the ring, before unloading a massive right hand in the sixth-round to finish the fight prematurely. Following the fight Price declared his intentions to return home to Liverpool for his next fight. Price was also made mandatory challenger for the vacant European Heavyweight title.

Price vs. Teper

On 15 May 2015, it was announced that Price would fight German boxer Erkan Teper, little-known but with an undefeated record of (14-0, 9 KOs) on 17 July. The bout was for the vacant EBU (European) heavyweight title and presented an opportunity for Price to become a top contender again. Price, who was the betting favourite, was caught in the second round with a left hook that knocked him unconscious. However, Teper was later found to have failed a drugs test. Teper was subsequently banned and the result changed to a No-Contest (disputed). Boxrec.com maintains that the record was not changed to a No-contest: "The EBU maintains that it was supervising the contest and as such EBU rules must be applied, therefore keeping the result of Teper WTKO 2 / 12 but stripping the title."

Career from 2016–2018
In February 2016, Price confirmed Dave Coldwell as his new trainer ahead of his May 29 fight at Goodison Park. It was announced Price would fight Vaclav Pejsar (9-2, 8 KOs) on the Bellew-Makabu undercard. Price was considerably bigger and more solid than in previous fights. During the first round, Price threw a counter uppercut that knocked Pejsar to the ground for the first time in his career and gave him a black eye. Pejsar came out aggressively in the second but eventually got put down from another uppercut and failed to beat the count. Following the victory Price publicly announced his desire to challenge then IBF champion Anthony Joshua.

Price continued his comeback on 1 October in Germany, stopping journeyman Ivica Perkovic in the second round with a body shot. Price was in control from the opening and his speed and power seemingly too much for the journeyman with a reputation for durability. Price hit Perkovic so hard in round two that it forced him to ask for the fight to be stopped as he was in too much agony to continue. He stated he now wanted to fight Joseph Parker if he can not secure a fight with Joshua. Price signed to fight Dave Allen in another tune up bout on 22 October but was forced to pull out due to illness.

Price vs. Hammer
On 8 January 2017 it was announced that Price would fight on the undercard of IBO super-middleweight bout Eubank Jr.-Quinlan at the Olympia in London on 4 February against WBO European heavyweight champion Christian Hammer (20-4, 11 KOs) to take place on ITV Box Office. Hammer won a split decision against previously undefeated Erkan Teper in October 2016. On 3 February, a day before the fight, it was confirmed that Hammer's WBO European heavyweight title would be at stake, as well as the fight being an official world title eliminator. Price started the fight well using his reach advantage to keep Hammer at a distance. In round 5, Price connected with an uppercut which floored Hammer, however he beat the count and the fight resumed. The end came when Hammer landed hooks to the head of Price as the referee looked at him and decided to stop the fight, giving Hammer the win via TKO in round 7.

On 7 August 2017, it was announced that Price would fight again on the undercard of Callum Smith vs. Erik Skoglund at the Echo Arena in Liverpool on 16 September 2017. Price last fought at the Echo Arena in July 2013, where he lost his second consecutive fight to American veteran Tony Thompson. It was revealed that Price had parted ways with trainer Dave Coldwell and would now train with George Vaughan, Derry Mathews and Joe McNally. Price called this fight a 'make or break' for career. A day later, it was announced that he would fight journeyman Raphael Zumbano Love. Former trainer Coldwell stated based on his last conversation with Price, he had decided to retire. Coldwell wished Price well in his return. Following a hand injury suffered in training, the fight was called off. Price would next fight UK based Polish journeyman Kamil Sokolowski on 2 December 2017 at the Brentwood Centre Arena in Brentford, having last fought there in 2010. Price put on a muted performance, beating Sokolowski after six rounds. The referee scored the fight 60–54 in favour of Price. He stated he intentionally went the full six rounds. In the post-fight interview, Price said, ”He’d be a good sparring partner. I thought that was a good performance tonight. I landed most of my jabs. I want to do an 8 rounder. I must have thrown 4 punches all night with spite in it. I was boxing his face off.” When asked who he would fight next, Price gave no names.

Price vs. Povetkin
On 16 January 2018, after unification fight Anthony Joshua vs. Joseph Parker was announced, promoter Eddie Hearn offered WBA mandatory challenger Alexander Povetkin an opportunity to fight on the undercard, which would take place on 31 March at the Principality Stadium in Cardiff, Wales. Price and Derek Chisora were two names offered as potential opponents. The next day, Price spoke to Sky Sports stating he accepted Hearn's offer and would be willing to fight Povetkin. On 30 January, Hearn told a reporter a deal was close being done after Povetkin also agreed to the fight. Three days later, the fight was officially confirmed. Povetkin won the fight via knockout in round 5. Povetkin badly hurt Price with a right hand, who was then defenseless, Povetkin finished off with a left hook that put Price down flat on the canvas. Without a count, referee Howard John Foster halted the fight. The official time of the stoppage was at 1:02 of round 5. In round 3, Povetkin knocked Price down with a right hand to the head. Price got up and came back strong landing some hard punches of his own. Price hurt Povetkin late in round 3 with a left hook which resulted in Povetkin falling backwards towards the ropes. The referee ruled it a knockdown due to the ropes holding Povetkin up. Price did not take advantage of the knockdown, but it looked as though he had tired himself out.

In early May, Price confirmed his comeback would be on 27 July at the Macron Stadium in Bolton. Due to a back injury, on the day of the event, MTK Global confirmed Price would not fight on the card.

Price vs. Kuzmin 
In early August 2018, it was rumoured that Price would appear on the Joshua vs. Povetkin undercard against rising Russian heavyweight Sergei Kuzmin (12-0-1, 9 KOs). On 20 August, it was announced that Price would next fight on 5 October at the Titanic Exhibition Centre in Belfast against Irish boxer Sean Turner (12-3, 8 KOs). On 10 September, Turner pulled out of the bout. Former two-time world title challenger Eric Molina was the first to put his name forward to fight Price, although at the time, he was banned for an anti-doping violation. On 13 September, according to MTK Global, Price was pulled from the card. Later that date, it was announced that Price would indeed fight Kuzmin on the Joshua vs. Povetkin card at the Wembley Stadium in London on 22 September. Price retired hurt at the end of the fourth round citing a bicep tear. At the time of the stoppage, Price appeared to be winning the fight at the time of the fight being halted, although he also appeared tired. Kuzmin showed that he was able to take Price's best power shots to keep coming. Kuzmin kept coming forward and landing hard body shots.

Price vs. Little 
In November 2018, trainer Joe McNally revealed Price would return to the ring on the Whyte vs. Chisora II undercard on 22 December at The O2 Arena on Sky Box Office. On 16 November, Hearn announced some undercard fights, one being Price against British boxer Tom Little in a 6-round bout. It would mark the third consecutive PPV undercard fight for Price. Little was Price's first British opponent since he beat Matt Skelton in November 2012. On 30 November, the fight was announced by Sky Sports as a 'must win' for Price. He won the fight by TKO in the fourth round.

Price vs. Ali 
On 30 March 2019, Price faced Kash Ali. Ali fought dirty from the get go, repeatedly fouling Price and also seemed to have bitten Price during the early rounds. It culminated in the fifth round, when Ali tackled and bit Price while he was on the canvas. The referee immediately called for a disqualification and awarded Price with the victory.

Price vs. Allen 
On 20 July 2019, Price faced domestic heavyweight rival David Allen. Contrary to what most boxing analysts expected, Price not only won the fight, but also did it by a big margin. Price dominated Allen throughout most of the fight as Allen wasn't able to get Price in any kind of trouble during all 10 rounds. After the tenth round, Allen's corner decided to stop the fight.

Price vs. Chisora 
On 26 October 2019, Price faced former world title challenger Dereck Chisora. Chisora was ranked #9 by the WBC at heavyweight, while Price was ranked #8 by the WBA. Chisora began the fight aggressively and had Price on the defensive in the first few rounds. Chisora had Price in trouble towards the end of the third round, to which Price countered with a right uppercut that put Chisora on notice. In the fourth round, Chisora managed to drop Price. Price managed to beat the count, but his corner deemed him not fit enough to continue and threw in the towel.

Retirement
On 7 October 2021, after two years of inactivity, Price announced his retirement from boxing via an Instagram post.

Personal life
Price is a club patron of A.F.C. Liverpool.

Professional boxing record

Notes

References

External links

Commonwealth Games results at BBC Sport
2007 Commonwealth Championships (not Commonwealth Games) Results
2nd qualifier
David Price - Profile, News Archive & Current Rankings at Box.Live

1983 births
Living people
English male boxers
Olympic boxers of Great Britain
Boxers at the 2008 Summer Olympics
Olympic bronze medallists for Great Britain
Olympic medalists in boxing
Boxers at the 2006 Commonwealth Games
Commonwealth Games gold medallists for England
Boxers from Liverpool
England Boxing champions
Medalists at the 2008 Summer Olympics
Heavyweight boxers
Super-heavyweight boxers
Commonwealth Boxing Council champions
Commonwealth Games medallists in boxing
British Boxing Board of Control champions
Medallists at the 2006 Commonwealth Games